Samson "Cioma" Schönhaus (28 September 1922 in Berlin – 22 September 2015 in Biel-Benken) was a graphic artist and writer who lived illegally as a Jew in hiding in Berlin during World War II. He was responsible for forging hundreds of identity documents to help other Jews survive during this time. He worked closely with members of the Confessing Church, including Franz Kaufmann and Helene Jacobs. He ultimately escaped from Berlin to Switzerland by bicycle in 1943, where he remained until his death. For the escape, he used a military identity card that he had forged himself.

His memoir, "The Forger," was published by Granta Books in 2007, translated from the German original (Der Passfälscher, published 2004). The feature film Der Passfälscher (The Passport Forger) from 2022 is also dedicated to his life; Schönhaus is portrayed here by Louis Hofmann.

Schönhaus was interviewed for the docudrama The Invisibles that was released after his death in 2017.

References

1922 births
2015 deaths
German graphic designers
German people of Belarusian descent
Belarusian Jews
Jewish emigrants from Nazi Germany to Switzerland
Russian refugees
Holocaust survivors
Writers from Berlin
German male writers